"Pacific Sun" is a song originally written and recorded by Force & Styles featuring Junior. It was originally released on white label in 1997 and appeared on their greatest hits album Heart of Gold (2000). The song has also been covered numerous times with other versions recorded by Flip & Fill featuring Junior, Ultrabeat and Darren Styles

Force & Styles version
The Force & Styles version of "Pacific Sun" is happy hardcore song with vocals by Junior. The song was written and recorded by the three at Force & Styles' UK Dance Studios in Clacton-on-Sea, Essex in 1997. "Pacific Sun" was pressed as a one-sided white label record their own label UK Dance Records in 1997. It was also re-released as a b-side to "Field of Dreams" later in 2001. Hardcore producers, Sy & Unknown, released their remix of the song in 2006, on their own label, Quosh Records. 
List of remixes
 "Pacific Sun" – 7:23
 "Pacific Sun" (Sy & Unknown remix) – 5:15

Cover versions

Flip & Fill version
In 2004, producers Flip & Fill covered the track with vocals by Junior, who had also written new verses for the song. The new song, titled "Pacific Sun (Lullaby)", was released by All Around the World on 12" promo and the song appeared on the Clubland 6 compilation album. The song is expected to appear on Flip & Fill's second album, which is yet to be released.
List of remixes
 "Pacific Sun (Lullaby)" (club mix)
 "Pacific Sun (Lullaby)" (Cheeky Trax remix)
 "Pacific Sun (Lullaby)" (Styles & Breeze remix)

Ultrabeat version
Liverpool producers, Ultrabeat, also signed to the All Around The World record label, had recorded a cover of Force & Styles' original "Pacific Sun". In 2007, the song was released as a bonus track on Ultrabeat: The Album.

Darren Styles & Re-Con version
Darren Styles recorded a new version of "Pacific Sun" for his second studio album Feel the Pressure (2010). This recording of the song had lead vocals performed by Darren Styles himself and contained an extra verse. It was produced by Darren Styles and Re-Con and was first performed live during the Darren Styles and Ultrabeat tour in 2009. It is also included on the compilation album Hardcore Til I Die 3 (2010).

References

External links
 Force & Styles featuring Junior – Pacific Sun at Discogs
 Flip & Fill featuring Junior  – Pacific Sun (Lullaby) at Discogs

1997 songs
Force & Styles songs
Flip & Fill songs
Ultrabeat songs
Songs written by Darren Styles